Goa Legislative Assembly election, 1977 was held in Indian Union territory of Goa in 1977, to elect 30 members to the Goa Legislative Assembly.

Results

|- align=center
!style="background-color:#E9E9E9" class="unsortable"|
!style="background-color:#E9E9E9" align=center|Political Party
!style="background-color:#E9E9E9" |Seats contested
!style="background-color:#E9E9E9" |Seats won
!style="background-color:#E9E9E9" |Number of Votes
!style="background-color:#E9E9E9" |% of Votes
!style="background-color:#E9E9E9" |Seat change
|-
| 
|align="left"|Maharashtrawadi Gomantak Party||29||15||116,339||38.49%|| 3
|-
| 
|align="left"|Indian National Congress||27||10||87,461||28.94%|| 9
|-
| 
|align="left"|Janata Party||30||3||69,823||23.10%|| 3
|-
| 
|align="left"|Independents||57||2||28,022||9.27%|| 1
|-
|
|align="left"|Total||145||30||302,237||||
|-
|}

Winning candidates

References

State Assembly elections in Goa
1970s in Goa
Goa
1970s in Goa, Daman and Diu
Elections in Goa, Daman and Diu